Jules Näveri is a Finnish singer who is known for his vast range of singing. He sings in bands called Profane Omen and Enemy of the Sun (band). He has also been a member of a Finnish band Misery Inc.

Näveri has performed as a guest vocalist on stage and on record with such acts like Insomnium, Amoral, myGRAIN etc.

Discography

With Profane Omen
Beaten Into Submission 2006
Disconnected EP 2007
Inherit The Void 2009
Destroy! 2011
Reset 2014

With Enemy of the Sun (band)
Shadows 2007
Caedium 2010

With Misery Inc.
Random End 2006

Guest appearances

Misery Inc. - Yesterday's Grave 2003
myGRAIN - Signs of Existence 2008
Chaosweaver - Puppetmaster of Pandemonium 2008
Insomnium - Across the Dark 2009
Vertigo Steps - The Melancholy Hour 2010

References

21st-century Finnish male singers
Living people
Year of birth missing (living people)